Kham Kar (also Romanized as Kham Kār) is a village in Qaleh-ye Khvajeh Rural District, in the Central District of Andika County, Khuzestan Province, Iran. At the 2006 census, its population was 67, in 10 families.

References 

Populated places in Andika County